Girona (officially and in Catalan , Spanish: Gerona ) is a city in northern Catalonia, Spain, at the confluence of the Ter, Onyar, Galligants, and Güell rivers. The city had an official population of 103,369 in 2020. Girona is the capital of the province of the same name and also capital of the comarca of the Gironès and the vegueria of Girona. Since much of the old quarter of this ancient city has been preserved, Girona is a popular destination for tourists, and film productions have used it as a filming location (e.g. Game of Thrones).

History
The first historical inhabitants in the region were Iberians; Girona is the ancient Gerunda, a city of the Ausetani. Later, the Romans built a citadel there, which was given the name of Gerunda. The Visigoths ruled in Girona until it was conquered by the Moors in 715. Charlemagne reconquered it in 785 and made it one of the fourteen original counties of Catalonia. It was wrested temporarily from the Moors, who recaptured it in 793. From this time until the Moors were finally driven out in 1015, the city repeatedly changed hands. It was sacked by the Moors in 827, 842, 845, 935, and 982. Wilfred the Hairy incorporated Girona into the County of Barcelona in 878.

In the 11th century, Alfons II of Aragon and I of Barcelona declared Girona a city. The ancient county became a duchy within the Principality of Catalonia in 1351 when King Peter III of Aragon gave the title of Duke to his first-born son, John. In 1414, King Ferdinand I in turn gave the title of Prince of Girona to his first-born son, Alfonso. The title is currently carried by Princess Leonor of Asturias, the second since the 16th century to do so.

The earliest documented evidence of a Jewish community in Girona dates to about 885.  The 12th century saw the Jewish community of Girona flourish, having one of the most important Kabbalistic schools in Europe. The Rabbi of Girona, Moshe ben Nahman Gerondi (better known as Nahmanides or Ramban) was appointed Great Rabbi of Catalonia. Centered on the Jewish Call (Call Jueu), the Jewish community of Girona came to an end in 1492, when the Catholic Monarchs outlawed Judaism throughout Spain and Jews were given the choice of conversion or exile (see Alhambra Decree). For 400 years before that time, the Jewish cemetery was located beside the road to France, just north of the old city between the mountain Montjuïc, or hill of the Jews in medieval Catalan, and the river Ter.

Girona has undergone twenty-five sieges and been captured seven times. It was besieged by the French royal armies under Charles de Monchy d'Hocquincourt in 1653, under Bernardin Gigault de Bellefonds in 1684, and twice in 1694 under Anne Jules de Noailles. During the Third siege of Girona of the Peninsular War, the city was besieged from May to December 1809 by 35,000 French Napoleonic troops under Vergier, Augereau and St. Cyr.  Continuously under heavy bombardment, Girona held out obstinately under the leadership of Álvarez de Castro until disease and famine compelled it to capitulate on 12 December.  Girona was the center of the Ter department during the French rule, which lasted from 1809 to 1813. The defensive city walls of the western side were demolished at the end of the 19th century to allow for the expansion of the city, while the walls of the eastern side remained untouched but abandoned.

In recent years, the missing parts of the city walls on the eastern side of the city have been reconstructed. Called the Passeig de la Muralla it now forms a tourist route around the old city.

Geography

Climate 
In the Köppen climate classification, Girona has a humid subtropical climate (Cfa), with cool winters and hot summers. In winter, temperatures can drop to below . In summer, maximum temperatures are typically . Although rainfall is evenly spread throughout the year, it is more common in spring (April–May) and autumn (September–November). The driest month is July. Thunderstorms are very common, particularly in the summer.

Main sights 

Girona is a popular destination for tourists and Barcelona day-trippers - the train journey from Barcelona Sants to Girona takes approximately forty minutes on high-speed trains, eighty with express ones and ninety with regional ones. The old town stands on the steep hill of the Caputxins to the east of the river Onyar, while the more modern section stands on the plains to the west. The city has a number of Art Nouveau buildings including the Farinera Teixidor by Rafael Masó.

Cathedral 

The ancient cathedral, which stood on the site of the present one, was used by the Moors as a mosque, and after their final expulsion was either entirely remodelled or rebuilt. The present edifice is one of the most important monuments of the school of the Majorcan architect Jaume Fabre and an excellent example of Catalan Gothic architecture. It is approached by ninety steps. An aisle and chapels surround the choir, which opens by three arches into the nave, of which the pointed stone vault is the widest in Christendom (22 meters). Among its interior decorations is a retable which is the work of the Valencian silversmith Pere Bernec. It is divided into three tiers of statuettes and reliefs, framed in canopied niches of cast and hammered silver. A gold and silver altar-frontal was carried off by the French in 1809. The cathedral contains the tombs of Ramon Berenguer and his wife.

Old fortifications 
The old fortifications are another popular sight. Historically, these have played a vital role in protecting Girona from invaders for hundreds of years. The city wall of the old town was an important military construction built in Roman times in the 1st century BC. It was thoroughly rebuilt under the reign of Peter III the Ceremonious in the second half of the 14th century. The Roman wall was used as a foundation. At the start of the 16th century, the wall was absorbed in the city. The walled precinct lost its military value. Bit by bit, the wall was degrading, as parts were gradually altered from the inside and the outside. The walls and lookout towers that make up these fortifications are split in two - a small section in the north of the old town and a much larger section to the east and south. It is possible to walk the walls and climb the towers, where visitors can enjoy panoramic views of Girona and the surrounding countryside.

Sant Feliu 

The Collegiate Church of Sant Feliu is noteworthy from an architectural point of view. Its style is 14th-century Gothic, the façade dating from the 18th, and it is one of the few Spanish churches which possesses a genuine spire. It contains, besides the sepulchre of its patron and the tomb of the valiant Álvarez, a chapel dedicated to St. Narcissus, who according to tradition was one of the early bishops of the see.

Sant Pere de Galligants 

The Benedictine church of the monastery of Sant Pere de Galligants is in the early Romanesque style, dating to about the year 1130, though the monastery dates to about 950. The monastery slightly predates the Monastery of St. Daniel.

Plaça de la Independència 

The Plaça de la Independència is one of the best known and busiest squares in Girona. Located in the Mercadal district in the city centre, it is also known as Plaça de Sant Agustí, after the former Convent of Sant Agustí.  Its name refers to the 1808–1814 War of Spanish Independence, part of the larger Peninsular War, against Napoleon Bonaparte.

The interest of the square lies in its 19th-century style, despite its being surrounded by identical austere neoclassical buildings with porches dedicated to the defenders of the city of Girona during the 1808 and 1809 sieges.
 
However, the symmetrical proportions of the square correspond more to contemporary interventions than its architectural past. The municipal architect Martí Sureda was the first to conceive an arcaded square with closed and neoclassical loops, and with some buildings having matching aesthetic proportions. The development of the area followed this scheme only in part. The construction of the first theatres in the city transgressed the concept of Martí Sureda. Until the 18th century, what that architect had imagined could not be completed. This part of the city in Noucentisme style is a romantic and timeless creation which nowadays captivates inhabitants and visitors. Today the area has great vitality because of the spread of cafés and restaurants, including some businesses well known for their history like the Café Royal, Cinema Albéniz and Casa Marieta.

Cases de l'Onyar 

Characteristic of Girona are the picturesque houses overlooking the river Onyar. These were built over many years and give the flavour of a small Mediterranean city. The façanes are painted according to a palette created by Enric Ansesa, James J. Faixó and the architects Fuses and J. Viader.

One of these houses (at Ballesteries 29, Girona) is Casa Masó, the birthplace of the architect Rafael Masó and an example of Noucentisme in Girona. Since 2006 it has been the headquarters of the Fundació Rafael Masó. The river façade can be recognised by its unique white color.

Jewish heritage 
Today, the historical Jewish quarter or Call Jueu is one of the best preserved in Europe and is a major tourist attraction. In 1492 the Jewish community was forced to choose between conversion and expulsion. Although the Jewish community abandoned the Jewish Call after this time and considerable revisions were made to its buildings over the subsequent 500 years, the neighborhood has remained. On Carrer de Sant Llorenç, a rectangular indentation that once held a mezuzah can be seen on the doorway of an old building. Within the Call, on Carrer de la Força, is the Centre Bonastruc ça Porta, an emblematic building that in the 15th century contained the last synagogue in Girona.  The Bonastruc ça Porta project started in the 1970s, when it became fashionable to renovate properties in the old town.  The Center hosts The Museum of Jewish History and The Institute of Nahmanid.

Culture

Popular culture 
The Barri Vell and the Girona Cathedral have been the set of several films, e.g. The Monk and episode 10 of season 6 of Game of Thrones.

Sports 
During the professional cycling season, various non-European pro cyclists have called Girona home, as illustrated in the book by Michael Barry, written during his time with the US Postal Service cycling team. Between races, cyclists do their training rides outside the city, which provides excellent training terrain.

In the Spring of 1997, Marty Jemison, Tyler Hamilton and George Hincapie moved to Girona as teammates of the US Postal Service Professional Cycling Team. This was the first year that American cyclists started living in Girona and meeting for training rides at the Pont de Pedra. Later, other well-known professional cyclists such as Lance Armstrong came to live in the city.

Football is also widely popular. The local Football club is Girona FC, who were promoted to La Liga in 2017. The club's stadium is Estadi Montilivi.

The city has a roller hockey team, GEiEG, one of the most important in Spain, which competes in the main League OK Liga.

Education
The city is the home of the Jaume Vicens Vives Secondary School, as well as the Universitat de Girona (University of Girona).

Economy and infrastructure

Transport

Road
The town is on the Autopista AP-7 and N-II. The city is also the hub of the local road network with routes to the coast and inland towards the Pyrenees.

Buses
The city has a comprehensive urban bus service operated by private companies. There are also services to the other towns in the Girona province and long-distance buses.

Rail
Girona is served at its new railway station to the west of the Old Town.  There are conventional trains from Barcelona to Portbou and the French border.

Girona is also an important stop on the AVE services from Paris, Marseille, Toulouse and Figueres to Barcelona, and from Figueres to Barcelona and Madrid.

The journey time to Barcelona is approximately 1 hour 35 minutes on the stopping "Regional" trains, 1 hour and 15 minutes by conventional train ("Media Distancia") or 37 minutes on the AVE. Madrid is reached in 3 h 45 min, also on the AVE.

Airport

It grew tremendously principally as a result of Ryanair choosing it as one of their European hubs, but then shrunk again after they relocated most of the flights to Barcelona El Prat.

Girona Airport is approximately a 30-minute bus ride from the bus terminal and train station in Girona city, and an hour from Barcelona centre,  to the south. The bus stops in the centre of Barcelona, at the Estació d'Autobusos Barcelona Nord, Barcelona's main bus terminal.

Most low cost airlines mention "Barcelona" in their descriptions of Girona airport.

Notable people
 

Carme García (born 1974), visually impaired para-alpine skier, blind sailor and journalist
Fidel Roig Matons (1887-1977), Catalan painter and musician
Miguel Molina (born 1989), racing driver
Josep Maria Nadal i Farreras (1949-), scholar of Catalan language

Twin towns – sister cities
Girona is twinned with:

 Girona is a member city of Eurotowns network

See also
La Girona
List of mayors of Girona

References

External links

Official website
 Government data pages 

 
Historic Jewish communities
Populated places in Gironès
Cities founded by Rome